The Highway Patrol Group is a police unit under the Philippine National Police (PNP).

History
The Highway Patrol Group was established as Traffic Control Group (Trafcon) in 1955 as a response to a high-profile vehicular accident along a highway in Pampanga, now known as the MacArthur Highway. The accident which occurred on November 4, 1954 which killed House of Representatives members Gregorio Tan of Samar and Lorenzo Ziga of Albay. President Ramon Magsaysay urged the Congress to establish a "specialized and dedicated" police unit to maintain road traffic safety across the Philippines.

The Trafcon was a unit under the Philippine Constabulary, which in turn was part of the Armed Forces of the Philippines. The Trafcon later became known as the Constabulary Highway Patrol Group. The HPG was absorbed in 1991 when the Philippine National Police was formed through the merger of the Constabulary and the Integrated National Police. The HPG became the Traffic Management Group. However the traffic law enforcement powers of the patrol group was given to the Metropolitan Manila Development Authority (MMDA) and local government units (LGUs) some years later.

The Highway Patrol Group returned to EDSA in 2015 and was tasked to enforce traffic laws due to worsening traffic conditions in the Metro Manila thoroughfare at the time. This is to augment MMDA traffic constables and LGU enforcers. The HPG last patrolled EDSA in 1994.

Organization
As the Traffic Control Group (Trafcon), the unit was under the Philippine Constabulary. It later became part of the Philippine National Police. The HPG has Regional Highway Patrol Units under it.

Role
The Highway Patrol Group is a highway patrol with a national scope. It is tasked to enforce traffic safety roles and provides general supervision to local police forces with regard to the enforcement of traffic laws. It also provides assistance to the Land Transportation Office, formerly the Bureau of Land Transportation. The HPG furthermore also enforces driver's licenses and motor vehicle registration and regulations with regards to public carriers.

Directors

References

External links
 

1955 establishments in the Philippines
Philippine National Police